"Machika" (presumed to mean "smash" in the Papiamento language) is a song recorded by Colombian singer J Balvin, Aruban singer Jeon and Brazilian singer Anitta. It was released as a single on 19 January 2018 through Capitol Records and Universal Music Latin from Balvin's studio album Vibras. The song was written by Balvin, Jeon and Anitta together with producer Sky Rompiendo. The song is produced by Clyde Narain and CHILDSPLAY.

Music video
Directed by 36 Grados, the accompanying music video premiered on Vevo the same day of the single release. It features a post-apocalyptic setting.

Live performances
J Balvin and Jeon Arvani first performed the song together at the Calibash festival in Los Angeles, without Anitta. Anitta later performed the song at the Festival Planeta Atlântida in Brazil.

Remixes
An EDM remix of the song by American DJ Dillon Francis was released on 30 March 2018. On 31 May 2018, a multilingual remix featuring artists G-Eazy, Sfera Ebbasta, MC Fioti and Duki was released.

Track listing
Digital download
 "Machika" – 3:02

Credits and personnel
Vocals – J Balvin, Jeon, Anitta
Songwriting – J Balvin, Jeon, Anitta, Sky Rompiendo, Clyde Sergio Narain
Production – Chuckie, CHILDSPLAY

Charts

Weekly charts

Year-end charts

Certifications

Machika (Remix)

See also
List of Billboard number-one Latin songs of 2018

References

External links

2018 songs
2018 singles
Spanish-language songs
Latin pop songs
Reggaeton songs
J Balvin songs
Anitta (singer) songs
Songs written by Anitta (singer)
Songs written by J Balvin